Greenfield Township is one of sixteen townships in Calhoun County, Iowa, United States.  As of the 2000 census, its population was 275.

History
Greenfield Township was created in 1870. It was probably named from the green prairie grass.

Geography

References

External links
 City-Data.com

Townships in Calhoun County, Iowa
Townships in Iowa